Tillabéri (var. Tillabéry) is a town in northwest Niger. It is situated 113 km northwest of the capital Niamey on the River Niger.  It is an important market town and administrative center, being the capital of department of Tillabéri and Tillabéri Region. The town had a population of over 16,000 at the 2001 census.

Climate
Tillabéri has a hot desert climate (Köppen climate classification BWh).

References

Tillabéri Region
Communes of Tillabéri Region